Dmitry Leonidovich Yefremov (born 12 December 1974) is a Ukrainian-born Russian football manager and a former player. He is the assistant manager of FC Olimp-Dolgoprudny.

External links
 

1974 births
Footballers from Kramatorsk
Ukrainian emigrants to Russia
Living people
Russian footballers
Ukrainian footballers
FC Shakhtar-2 Donetsk players
FC Kramatorsk players
FC Volgar Astrakhan players
FC Kuban Krasnodar players
FC Oryol players
FC Spartak Kostroma players
Russian football managers
Association football midfielders
FC Mashuk-KMV Pyatigorsk players